Berthella ornata is a species of sea slug, a marine gastropod mollusk in the family Pleurobranchidae. It is sometimes called the ornate side-gilled sea slug.

Description
The rhinophores are brown with white tips.
B. ornata is slow moving and feeds on sponges at night, often emitting a milky fluid if disturbed. It is usually found hiding under boulders and stones during the day, with the head and rhinophores retracted under the mantle.

Distribution
Endemic to New Zealand, where it is becoming less common. It is found at low tide through the sub-littoral fringe down to 6 metres deep.

References

Pleurobranchidae
Molluscs of the Pacific Ocean
Gastropods of New Zealand
Endemic fauna of New Zealand
Gastropods described in 1878
Taxa named by Thomas Frederic Cheeseman
Endemic molluscs of New Zealand